A multiple referendum with five questions was held in the Bahamas on 27 February 2002. Voters were asked whether they approved of:
the removal of gender discrimination from the constitution
the creation of a national commission to monitor the standards of teachers
the creation of an independent parliamentary commissioner
the creation of an independent election boundaries commission
the increase of the retirement ages of judges from 60 to 65 (or 68 to 72 for appellate judges)
All five questions were rejected by voters, with between 62.8 and 70.9% voting against.

Results

References

2002 referendums
2002 in the Bahamas
Referendums in the Bahamas